Upwey railway station may refer to:

Currently open stations:
 Upwey railway station (England), in Upwey, Dorset
 Upwey railway station, Melbourne, Australia

Disused stations:
 Upwey railway station (Abbotsbury Railway), Dorset, England
 Upwey Wishing Well Halt railway station, Dorset, England